An elf is a mythological creature, originally from Germanic mythology.

Elf or Elves may also refer to:

Elves of the fantasy genre
Elf (Dungeons & Dragons)
Elf (Middle-earth)
Elves (Discworld)
Christmas elf
House-elf

Entertainment 
 Elf (film), a 2003 American Christmas comedy film
 Elf (musical), based on the film
 Elf (band), an American band
 Elf (album), their 1972 album
 Elves (film), a 1989 American horror film
 Lego Elves, a toy line and media franchise that began in 2015
 Elves (TV series) a 2021 Danish television series

Politics 
 Earth Liberation Front, an international environmentalist political group
 Environmental Life Force, an American radical environmental group
 Eritrean Liberation Front, a main independence movement in Eritrea
 Essential Living Fund, an English welfare assistance scheme
 European Liberal Forum, a think-tank associated with the ALDE Party
 European Liberation Front, a neo-fascist group

Science and technology 
 Electron localization function
 ELVES, a type of lightning
 Enceladus Life Finder, a proposed NASA astrobiology mission to Saturn's moon Enceladus
 Extremely low frequency, electromagnetic radiation (radio waves) with frequencies from 3 to 30 Hz

Computing 
 COSMAC ELF, a single-board computer kit based on the RCA 1802 microprocessor
 Executable and Linkable Format, a file format for executables
 Extended Log Format, standardised text format for log files
 Elf, a tablet in the NOVO7 series

Vehicles
 Ekolot JK 01A Elf, a Polish motorglider
 Isuzu Elf, a truck model
 Riley Elf, an automobile
 , a United States Navy patrol boat
 Elf (yacht), an American racing yacht
 Pesa Elf, a Polish electric multiple unit
 Elf, a tugboat taken into British Empire service as Empire Belle

Other uses
•  .elf, a common standard file format
 Elf Aquitaine, a French oil company
 ELF Corporation, a Japanese eroge game studio
 Elvish Linguistic Fellowship, an organization that studies the invented languages of J. R. R. Tolkien
 Endangered Language Fund, an American linguistic group
 English as a lingua franca
 Environmental Law Foundation, a British charity
 Estonian Nature Fund, an environmental organization
 European Lacrosse Federation
 European League of Football, a professional American football league
 Eyes Lips Face, an international cosmetics brand
 Eretis, a genus of butterfly
 Microtia elva, a species of butterfly

See also
 ALF (disambiguation)
 Elfin (disambiguation)
 Elph (disambiguation)